WDEF-TV (channel 12) is a television station in Chattanooga, Tennessee, United States, affiliated with CBS. Owned by Morris Multimedia, the station maintains studios on Broad Street in Chattanooga and a transmitter in nearby Signal Mountain. Although parts of the Chattanooga market are in the Central Time Zone, all schedules are listed in Eastern Time.

History
The station signed on the air on April 25, 1954, carrying programming from all four networks, though it has always been a primary CBS affiliate. It took the CBS affiliation from WROM-TV (channel 9, now WTVC). It lost NBC to WRGP-TV (now WRCB-TV) in 1956, and lost ABC to WTVC (the former WROM) in 1958. During the late 1950s, the station was also briefly affiliated with the NTA Film Network.

Roy H. Park bought WDEF-TV, as well as WDEF radio (1370 AM, now WXCT) in 1963. His media interests eventually became known as Park Communications, which was bought by Media General in 1997. In 2006, Media General sold the station to Morris Multimedia.

Programming
Syndicated programming on WDEF includes Judge Judy, Right This Minute,  and The Andy Griffith Show.

In its early years, WDEF was locally oriented, offering a mix of children's shows, talk and variety programs, including Point of View, one of the longest–running local public affairs programs in the United States.

WDEF has been the local home of Tennessee Titans (based in Nashville) games since 1998 (when the team was still called the Oilers). This comes with its CBS affiliation, as CBS carries all National Football League games played in the afternoon that feature a road team from the American Football Conference, which the Titans play in.

Technical information

Subchannels
The station's digital signal is multiplexed:

Analog-to-digital conversion
WDEF-TV shut down its analog signal, over VHF channel 12, on February 17, 2009, the original target date in which full-power television stations in the United States were to transition from analog to digital broadcasts under federal mandate (which was later pushed back to June 12, 2009). The station's digital signal relocated from its pre-transition UHF channel 47 to VHF channel 12 for post-transition operations. Immediately before the shutdown, anchor Joe Legge gave a brief retrospective of the station's history as well as the farewell message for all analog viewers. The message ended with images of the past newscasts.

References

External links

Location of WDEF studios on Wikimapia
Huntsville Rewound-Huntsville AL TV Memories

DEF-TV
CBS network affiliates
Bounce TV affiliates
Ion Mystery affiliates
Grit (TV network) affiliates
Morris Multimedia
Television channels and stations established in 1954
1954 establishments in Tennessee